The Worshipful Company of Tallow Chandlers is one of the ancient livery companies of the City of London. The organisation, which engaged not only in tallow candle making but also in the trade of oils, first received a Royal Charter in 1462.

Traditionally tallow chandlers operated separately from wax chandlers: beeswax candles customarily being used in churches and noble houses, while tallow (animal fat) candles were generally used in other homes. As is the case with most other livery companies, the Tallow Chandlers' Company is no longer a trade association of candlemakers, its decline precipitated by the advent of electric lighting. The company now exists as a charitable institution and supports education in oil-related fields.

The company ranks 21st in the Precedence of Livery Companies in the City of London. Its motto is Ecce Agnus Dei, Ecce Qui Tollit Peccata Mundi: Latin for "Behold the Lamb of God, Who Takes Away the Sins of the World", words of St John the Baptist (Patron Saint of the Company) in reference to Jesus.

External links
 The Tallow Chandlers' Company

Livery companies
1462 establishments in England
Corporatism
Companies of medieval England
Charities based in London
Grade II* listed livery halls